Thermopsis mollis is a species of flowering plant in the legume family known by the common names Allegheny Mountain goldenbanner, soft bush pea, and soft-haired thermopsis. It is native to the southeastern United States from southern Virginia to northern Georgia.

This plant is a rhizomatous perennial herb with erect, branching stems growing up to 1.5 meters tall. The inflorescence is a raceme at the top of the stem. The fruit is a legume pod up to 7 centimeters long. The plant reproduces by seed and by sprouting from its woody rhizome.

This plant grows in the Appalachian Mountains and the Piedmont uplands.

References

External links
The Nature Conservancy: Thermopsis mollis

Sophoreae
Flora of the Southeastern United States
Taxa named by Moses Ashley Curtis
Taxa named by Asa Gray
Taxa named by André Michaux